CY-208,243 is a drug which acts as a dopamine agonist selective for the D1 subtype. Unlike most D1-selective agonists, it shows efficacy in animal models of Parkinson's disease.

References

D1-receptor agonists
Ergolines